Mitchell Lee Schauer (pronounced "shower") (born December 18, 1955) is an American animation professional who has been involved television programs and feature films since 1978. He is perhaps best known as the creator of the critically acclaimed Nickelodeon animated sitcom The Angry Beavers.

Schauer cited 1960s cartoons such as The Pink Panther, The Flintstones, and Rocky and Bullwinkle as primary influences for his work.

Early life

Mitch Schauer graduated from Daniel Webster High School in Tulsa, Oklahoma in 1974.

He briefly attended Tulsa Junior College, then studied with Disney's character animation program at California Institute of the Arts ('76–77). He graduated with a BFA degree in Advertising and Illustration from ArtCenter College of Design in 1980.

Art career

Besides working in animation, Schauer has also been a book illustrator including comic books (DNAgents, Jonny Quest) children's books such as Pogman, with his most recently published work being as writer/illustrator of his own graphic novel, Rip M.D. and cover artist for Famous Monsters of Filmland (Oct. 2011).

Beginning as an animation layout artist then switching over to freelance storyboard artist, Schauer has worked for virtually every television animation production company in the industry including Garfield and Friends and Mighty Mouse: The New Adventures. In 1984, he designed the intro sequence for Super Friends: The Legendary Super Powers Show. His first assignment as producer was The 13 Ghosts of Scooby-Doo, leading to his winning of an Emmy Award in 1995 as producer of Warner Brothers' Freakazoid!. Schauer also worked as an assistant storyboard artist for Nickelodeon's The Ren & Stimpy Show, Rocko's Modern Life, and Hey Arnold!. In 1997, he created  The Angry Beavers for Nickelodeon. His daughters, Stacy and Chelsea, voiced the Beaver brothers' younger sisters in two episodes and an unaired pilot, "Simply Sisters".

Partnering with Paul Rugg, he co-created and co-directed The Sam Plenty Cavalcade of Action Show Plus Singing! for the Jim Henson Company.
 
Having completed character model designs and storyboarding for Marvel/Lionsgate's direct-to-DVD animated features, Schauer has recently wrapped his Supervising Director chores on 52 episodes of The Super Hero Squad Show for Marvel and Film Roman and begun pre-production on another Marvel series to be released through their own animation studio. He is also developing animated features based on his concepts, Rip M.D., TARGET! HARRY SHANKS and a live-action untitled horror biopic.

Personal life
Schauer has been married to Cindy Louise Schauer since 1978. Together they have three children; Stacy (born 1980), Chelsea (born 1982) and Robert (born 1986).

References

External links
Mitch Schauer's official website

American storyboard artists
American animators
American television producers
American television directors
American television writers
American male television writers
Annie Award winners
Hanna-Barbera people
Nickelodeon Animation Studio people
Showrunners
1955 births
Living people
People from Pawhuska, Oklahoma
Webster High School (Tulsa, Oklahoma) alumni
California Institute of the Arts alumni
Screenwriters from Oklahoma
Animators from Oklahoma